Patna Collegiate School is a Government High School located in Patna, Bihar, India. It was established by officials of East India Company on 10 August 1835 to spread the english pattern of education in Bihar. Its previous name was Patna High School. It was founded at Alan Ganj, Ashok Rajpath, Patna and is the oldest High School in the State of Bihar, India.
The school is located at Dariyapur, Patna and is affiliated with the Bihar School Examination Board. The current principal of the school is Dr. Madhuri Dwivedi.

History

Patna Collegiate School, Patna was founded on 10 August 1835 by the officials of East India Company. In 1862 the name of the school was changed to its present name of Patna Collegiate School and was transferred to the place which is now referred as Patna Campus. Mr. J. E. Mecridle was appointed its head and was designated as its Principal.

In 1915 IA Course of Patna College, Patna was transferred to Patna Collegiate and it was renamed New College (Junior Patna College). Till June 1927, It functioned as New College.

On 1 July 1927, the school unit of New College was transferred to its present building and since then the institution is functioning in the name of Patna Collegiate School, Dariyapur, Patna.

The school offered higher secondary education from class 9 to 12 (Intermediate), after class 10 (matriculation) students have to choose a stream for their intermediate education, Science and Arts are the streams currently available in this school.

Location

The school is located in Dariyapur locality of Patna. It is at a distance of 1 kilometer from places like Gandhi Maidan, Patna University, PMCH, Patna Collectorate and Moin-ul-Haq Stadium.

School building and facilities

The main school building has 34 class rooms. The school building also houses Physics, Chemistry and Biology laboratories.

The physics laboratory is equipped with all modern apparatus like p-n junction diode, zener diode, transistors, LED, Phone transistor & important ingredients of logic gate. The Chemistry Laboratory is equipped with Gas supply facility. The Biology Laboratory is equipped with compound microscopes.

The school also has a big play ground and is used to organize sports tournaments and events.

School under Government of Bihar

As per provisions of National Education Policy (10+2+3), the Govt. of Bihar in July 1984 started +2 teaching from the academic session 1984 - 86 in the institution. The teaching was initiated in the Science & Arts Stream. Government of Bihar is planning to launch Virtual Classroom for the school.

Notable alumni

 Bidhan Chandra Roy - Second Chief Minister of West Bengal
 Jayaprakash Narayan - Indian independence activist, social reformer and political leader
 Satish Kumar Jha
 Shatrughan Sinha - Actor and Member of Parliament
 Ravi Shankar Prasad
 Justice Aftab Alam (judge) - Retired Indian Supreme Court Judge
 Sudhir Kumar Kataria - Retired Patna High Court Judge
 Kunal - Bhojpuri Actor
 Lalji Prasad - Mathematician
 Sunit Kumar - IPS Officer
 Vineet Kumar - Actor
Yashwant Sinha -Former Finance Minister of India
Satya Narayan -Composer of "Mere Bharat Ke Kanthhar" Bihar Rajya Geet
Satish Prasad Jha -Freedom Fighter Of Quit India Movement On 8 August 1942
Maheshwar Prasad Sinha -Former Government Employee
AMOL PRATAP - mathematician

References

External links
 Official Website - Patna Collegiate School

Schools in Patna
High schools and secondary schools in Bihar
Educational institutions established in 1835
1835 establishments in India